The Akeron MP (Akeron Moyenne Portée), formerly known as MMP (Missile Moyenne Portée; English: Medium-Range Missile), is a French fifth generation, network-enabled, anti-tank guided missile system. Featuring both fire-and-forget and command guidance operating modes, it also integrates third party target designation for indirect firing scenarios through its lock-on after launch capability for non-line-of-sight (NLOS) use.

Entering French service from 2017 onwards, the Akeron MP was developed by MBDA France and is intended as a replacement for the MILAN and American-made FGM-148 Javelin. It is designed for dismounted infantry (being man-portable) as well as for integration on combat vehicles and has a firing range of up to 5 km.

A long-range, air-launched missile of the same family, the Akeron LP (Akeron Longue Portée), is also in development. It is intended to equip the upcoming French Eurocopter Tiger MkIII.

Origins 
The MMP programme originated in 2009 to develop a successor to MBDA's forty-year old MILAN. This was particularly in response to a French urgent operational requirement which had also led to the purchase of the US-made Javelin in 2010, rather than additional MILAN missiles; 260 Javelins were ordered because of the missile's fire-and-forget capability. MBDA's improved MILAN-ER offer was rejected because it lacked such a feature. The UK, previously a major user of the MILAN system, had also converted to Javelin.

In 2011, the requirement set by the French Army called for a multipurpose precision strike capability to equip the frontline units as well as special operation forces. The missile to be procured had to be able to destroy ground targets, fixed or moving, from light vehicles up to the latest generation MBTs, as well as personnel whether dismounted or protected behind fortifications. The firing officer had to be protected during the engagement, therefore requiring ease of operation, fire and forget guidance and a capability to fire the missile from confined spaces.

After competing against the Lockheed Martin/Raytheon Javelin and Rafael Spike, an order was placed in December 2013 by the French DGA to begin equiping the French Army with the MMP in 2017. Tests began in early 2014, with warhead tests against MBT armour and were pursued in April with launches in a test tunnel to confirm missile safety for the operating crew. MMP was displayed at Eurosatory 2014.

The first firing trial of the MMP was carried out by the DGA in its Bourges (central France) facilities on 3 February 2015, with the missile hitting a fixed target at a range of over 4,000 meters.

The development programme had been funded privately by MBDA, and scheduled to be completed by 2017. On 29 November 2017, the DGA announced the delivery of a first batch of 20 firing posts and 50 MMP missiles after a successful operational evaluation firing campaign held by the French Army. The first units will be used for training ahead of deployment in 2018. Initial plans are for the delivery of 400 firing posts and 1,750 missiles to the French Army's infantry and cavalry units as well as special forces of all military branches by 2025, with options for further orders totaling 2,850 missiles. In addition to the MILAN and the Javelin systems, the MMP will also replace in French service the Eryx, and HOT missile mounted on the VAB Armored Fighting Vehicle as well as arm the EBRC Jaguar.

Description 
The MMP was designed to overcome some of MILAN's limitations in the context of small-scale and counter-insurgency operations post-2000, rather than the Cold War tank war of the original MILAN requirement. In theatres such as Iraq and Afghanistan, man-portable missile were often used against strongpoints and improvised armour within populated areas. Reducing collateral damage to nearby civilians became a major political factor in such campaigns.

Particular developments over existing missiles were for it to be safe for operators within a confined space, i.e. reduced backblast on launch, and for improved guidance that could target non-IR cold targets as well as AFVs with a reduced risk of collateral damage. Compared to its predecessors it contains a great deal of modern and COTS electronics, rather than the previously slow-moving development of military procurement.

The missile and its guidance system offer three different operating modes:[4]
 Fire-and-Forget
 Man In The Loop with optical fiber data-link
 Lock-on after launch (LOAL) for non-line-of-sight (NLOS) and using third party target designation.

Despite these new features, it was still to remain effective against modern AFV and MBT armour. A tandem warhead is used, making it effective against conventional, composite and reactive armour.

At commercial launch, MBDA introduced the MMP as the first land combat missile of 5th generation thanks to the following key features: 
 A dual-band seeker in both IR and visible low-light video, enabling the engagement of hot and cold targets in all visibility conditions.[4] The IR sensor is not cooled, which would restrict some performance for an anti-aircraft missile but is a major simplification for an infantry missile. In particular it avoids relying on a pressurized gas supply which would need to be replenished at depot level. Unlike some missiles, such as Stinger, with gas-cooled IR sensors or one-shot thermal batteries, MMP may be locked-on to potential targets repeatedly without consuming resources. These two sensors are mounted on a reversible axis in the dome, with the operator selecting which sensor mode to deploy before launch. In comparison with the classic side-by-side dual sensors, this arrangement provides a much wider field of view allowing the seeker to keep targets, especially fast moving ones, within the missile’s field of view thereby greatly easing after launch lock-on.
 Also dual mode, the firing post of the initial infantry version features a high resolution infrared cooled sensor and a daylight TV camera. These sensors high quality support all weather reconnaissance and threat evaluation functions. A fibre optics data link links from the missile presents the seeker images back to the firing station for Man In The Loop control. This also allows a launch to be aborted without detonation, should a collateral civilian suddenly obscure the target. For direct fires, the seeker is locked on before launch thanks to an automatic correlation with the firing post images, which secures and simplifies seeker lock on especially on targets at maximum range. This firing post also features a GPS receiver, a compass and an optional laser range finder which allows full netcentricity and exchange of target coordinates through tactical datalinks for third party target designation.
 The missile integrates an Inertial Measurement Unit (IMU), which is new in this class of light missiles, developed in MEMS (Micro Electro Mechanical Systems) Technology.  Together with the fiber optics data link, this IMU allows in flight targeting and re-targeting for lock on after launch (LOAL) operations and also authorizes two selectable trajectory options: low altitude with direct attack or top attack for targeting main battle tanks (MBT) through their turret, which is their weakest point.
Both modes also feature an anti-personnel capability.
 Lightweight, and easily man-portable. The missile measures  in length for a  caliber. The complete round weighs  including its tactical canister. The firing post weighs , including its tripod and battery. The first missiles supplied are man-portable, but vehicle mounts are in development.
 Safe firing from confined spaces, with reduced blast both behind and forward of the launcher. The missile may be launched with infantry in close proximity ahead.
 Minimizing risk of collateral damage.

Evolution of the program 
At Eurosatory 2016, MBDA also unveiled its new IMPACT turret. This 250 kg motorized turret was presented on a Dagger, a small armored vehicle produced by Renault Trucks Defense. It carries the day/night sensors of the MMP fire control, as well as two ready-to-fire missiles and a 7.62 mm machine gun and its ammunition for self-defense.

In 2017, MBDA offered its MMP to the Australian Defence Force as an integrated ATGW on both the Rheinmetall Boxer (on the 30 mm Lance turret) and the BAE Systems AMV35 vehicles (on the 35 mm BAE Hägglunds turret) under the Australian Army’s LAND 400 program. The missile is also being offered with its Infantry Firing Post for the Army’s LAND 4108 program, which is seeking a replacement to the in-service Javelin ATGW.

At Eurosatory 2018, the French Army’s new Jaguar reconnaissance vehicle (developed by Nexter Systems, Arquus and Thales) was unveiled with a pod of two MMP integrated next to the turret. During the exhibition, MBDA and Milrem Robotics also announced the start of feasibility studies of an “anti-tank unmanned ground vehicle”. The joint project integrates the Milrem Robotics THeMIS unmanned ground vehicle with the MBDA IMPACT (Integrated MMP Precision Attack Combat Turret) system fitted with two MMP.

In August and September 2018, the French Army conducted a firing campaign in Djibouti in order to test the ability of the missile to operate in a desert environment. According to the government, nine MMP were successfully fired. Two of them were fired by the commandos from an ECUME rigid hulled inflatable boat (RHIB). The missiles were integrated in a stabilised and teleoperated turret, thus opening the way to a naval version of the MMP.

In December, the Picardy Battle Group conducted an operation in the three-border region in the south-east of Mali, during which the new medium-range missile (Missile Moyenne Portée or MMP) MMP was deployed and used for the first time in a combat theatre.

In early 2019, MBDA, the DGA and the STAT organised another firing campaign in order to test the performance of the MMP in cold conditions. They performed three successful firings in Sweden with temperature reaching -30 °C.

Variants

India 
In February 2017, MBDA announced the beginning of a joint venture (JV) with the Indian conglomerate Larsen & Toubro (L&T). This JV Company will notably look to develop and supply fifth generation Anti-Tank Guided Missiles (ATGMs), inspired by the MMP, in order to meet the requirement issued by the Indian Army.

Sweden 

In July 2021, France and Sweden agreed to co-develop a new anti-tank missile based on MBDA’s Missile Moyenne Portée (Medium-Range Missile/MMP) missile. The French Direction Générale de l'Armement (DGA) signed a letter of intent with Swedish Defence Materiel Administration (Försvarets materielverk or FMV) to build these new missiles. Saab will be the Swedish partner for the contract. The Swedish variant will be known as RBS-58.

Operators
The French Army received a first batch of 50 MMP missiles and 20 firing posts in November 2017. These first units will be used to train future users. The weapon system will be deployed in operations in the course of 2018 and the delivery of 400 firing posts and 1,950 missiles across all of the French Armed Forces by 2025 is already planned.

In December 2017, Qatar reportedly opened negotiations with MBDA in order to acquire MMPs for up to 400 million euros. Most of Qatar current anti-tank missiles are to be dismantled and the country is looking to renew its stocks. Doha currently possesses around 650 missiles -mostly HOT and old version of the Milan- that should be destroyed.

Current operators 
 : 400 launchers and 2,850 missiles to enter service from 2017.

Future operators 
 : 90 missiles ordered in 2022, with deliveries to start before 2025.
 : A few units of Akeron MP missile systems were ordered for testing and evaluation. A variant of the missile, the RBS-58, is being developed for the Swedish Armed Forces. It will be license built by Saab Dynamic AB.

Potential operators 
 
 : The system is one of those considered by the Portuguese Army to replace the current ATGM MILAN systems.

See also
 ALAS (missile)
 FGM-148 Javelin
 HJ-12
 NLAW
 OMTAS
 Spike (missile)
 Type 01 LMAT

References

External links
 MBDA Akeron MP page

Anti-tank guided missiles of France
Military equipment introduced in the 2010s
Fire-and-forget weapons